Subramaniam Pasupathipillai is a Sri Lankan Tamil politician and provincial councillor.

Pasupathipillai is secretary of the Kilinochchi District branch of the Illankai Tamil Arasu Kachchi. He contested the 2013 provincial council election as one of the Tamil National Alliance's candidates in Kilinochchi District and was elected to the Northern Provincial Council. After the election he was appointed to assist the Chief Minister on electricity and electrification. He took his oath as provincial councillor in front of Chief Minister C. V. Vigneswaran at Veerasingam Hall on 11 October 2013.

References

Illankai Tamil Arasu Kachchi politicians
Living people
Members of the Northern Provincial Council
People from Northern Province, Sri Lanka
Sri Lankan Tamil politicians
Tamil National Alliance politicians
Year of birth missing (living people)